Givi Pyotrovich Chikvanaia (May 29, 1939 – August 2, 2018) was a Georgian water polo player who competed for the Soviet Union in the 1960 Summer Olympics and in the 1968 Summer Olympics.

He was born in Telavi.

In 1960 he won the silver medal with the Soviet team in the Olympic water polo competition. He played all seven matches and scored seven goals.

Eight years later he won his second silver medal with the Soviet team in the water polo tournament at the 1968 Games. He played all eight matches.

See also
 List of Olympic medalists in water polo (men)

External links
 

1939 births
2018 deaths
People from Telavi
Male water polo players from Georgia (country)
Soviet male water polo players
Olympic water polo players of the Soviet Union
Water polo players at the 1960 Summer Olympics
Water polo players at the 1968 Summer Olympics
Olympic silver medalists for the Soviet Union
Olympic medalists in water polo
Medalists at the 1968 Summer Olympics
Medalists at the 1960 Summer Olympics